The Philippine forest horseshoe bat (Rhinolophus inops) is a species of bat in the family Rhinolophidae. It is endemic to the Philippines.

References

Rhinolophidae
Mammals of the Philippines
Mammals described in 1905
Endemic fauna of the Philippines
Taxa named by Knud Andersen
Taxonomy articles created by Polbot
Bats of Southeast Asia